Tamada is a toastmaster in Georgia.

Tamada may also refer to:

People
Abderrahmane Tamada (born 1985), Tunisian former track and field athlete
Makoto Tamada (born 1976), Japanese motorcycle racer
Keiji Tamada (born 1980), Japanese association footballer
Yasuko Tamada (born 1967), Japanese mixed martial artist

Other uses
 Diocese of Tamada, an ancient town still in use as a titular bishopric
 Culicoides tamada, a biting midge in the genus Culicoides
 Bir Tamada or Bir al-Tamada, the site of an Egyptian airfield bombed in the Six-Day War
 

Japanese-language surnames